The Saint-Esprit group was a type of three 80-gun ships of the line of the French Navy. They did not constitute a single class, as each was built to a separate design, but they each carried a standard ordnance amounting to 80 guns.

Ships in class
 Saint-Esprit. Renamed Scipion.
Builder: Brest
Ordered: 11 January 1762
Launched: 12 October 1765
Fate: Lost in storm on 26 january 1795

 Languedoc, renamed Anti-fédéraliste and Victoire.
Builder: Toulon
Ordered: 9 December 1761
Launched: 15 May 1766
Fate: Broken up in 1799 in Brest

 Couronne.
Builder: Arsenal of Brest
Ordered: 1766
Launched: May 1768
Fate: Accidentally burnt at Brest in 1781. A replacement, Couronne was constructed from the salvaged remains. Renamed Ça Ira in 1792, this ship was captured by Britain on 14 March 1795, destroyed in an accidental fire on 11 April 1796.

 
80-gun ship of the line classes
Ship of the line classes from France
Ship classes of the French Navy